Carmarthen West and South Pembrokeshire is a constituency of the House of Commons of the Parliament of the United Kingdom. It elects one Member of Parliament (MP) by the first past the post system of election.

The Carmarthen West and South Pembrokeshire Senedd constituency was created with the same boundaries in 1999 (as an Assembly constituency).

Boundaries

The constituency was created in 1997 from parts of the former marginal seats of Pembroke and Carmarthen. Main population areas in the seat include the towns of Carmarthen, Pembroke Dock, Pembroke and Tenby. Saundersfoot and Dylan Thomas' homestead of Laugharne are also within the constituency.

The constituency includes the whole of 22 Carmarthenshire communities (Abernant; Bronwydd; Carmarthen; Cilymaenllwyd; Cynwyl Elfed; Eglwyscummin; Henllanfallteg; Laugharne Township; Llanboidy; Llanddowror; Llangain; Llangynin; Llangynog; Llanpumsaint; Llansteffan; Llanwinio; Meidrim; Newchurch and Merthyr; Pendine; St Clears; Trelech; Whitland), the whole of 24 Pembrokeshire communities (Amroth; Angle; Carew; Cosheston; East Williamston; Hundleton; Jeffreyston; Kilgetty/Begelly; Lampeter Velfrey; Lamphey; Llanddewi Velfrey; Llawhaden; Manorbier; Martletwy; Narberth; Pembroke; Pembroke Dock; Penally; St Florence; St Mary Out Liberty; Saundersfoot; Stackpole and Castlemartin; Templeton; and Tenby), also the eastern part of the Pembrokeshire community of Uzmaston, Boulston and Slebech.

Profile
Carmarthen West and South Pembrokeshire is a marginal seat between the Labour Party and the Conservatives. The Conservatives are very strong around the more rural parts of the seat along with Pembroke, whereas Carmarthen and Pembroke Dock are more inclined to the Labour Party. Plaid Cymru is traditionally stronger in West Carmarthenshire as well as the Tenby area where several local councillors represent the party.

Members of Parliament

Elections

Elections in the 1990s

Elections in the 2000s

Elections in the 2010s

	

Of the 65 rejected ballots:
44 were either unmarked or it was uncertain who the vote was for.
14 voted for more than one candidate.
7 had writing or a mark by which the voter could be identified.

Of the 146 rejected ballots:
110 were either unmarked or it was uncertain who the vote was for.
35 voted for more than one candidate.
1 had writing or a mark by which the voter could be identified.

See also 
 Carmarthen West and South Pembrokeshire (Senedd constituency)
 List of parliamentary constituencies in Dyfed
 List of parliamentary constituencies in Wales

References

External links 
nomis Constituency Profile for Carmarthen West and South Pembrokeshire — presenting data from the ONS annual population survey and other official statistics.
Politics Resources (Election results from 1922 onwards)
Electoral Calculus (Election results from 1955 onwards)
2017 Election House Of Commons Library 2017 Election report
A Vision Of Britain Through Time (Constituency elector numbers)

Parliamentary constituencies in South Wales
Constituencies of the Parliament of the United Kingdom established in 1997
Districts of Carmarthenshire
Districts of Pembrokeshire
Politics of Carmarthenshire